USCGC Midgett (WMSL-757) is the eighth  of the United States Coast Guard and is stationed in Honolulu, Hawaii. The cutter was constructed by Huntington Ingalls Industries' Ingalls Shipbuilding Division in Pascagoula Mississippi and delivered to the Coast Guard in April 2019. It is named in honor of all members of the Midgett family who have served in the U.S. Coast Guard, United States Life-Saving Service, and/or other predecessor life-saving services. Seven members of the Midgett family have been awarded the Gold Lifesaving Medal including John Allen Midgett Jr. and Rasmus Midgett.

Construction Milestones
Ingalls Shipbuilding conducted at-sea builder's trials for the cutter on January 22–25 and February 12–13, 2019. The cutter underwent acceptance testing conducted by the U.S. Navy Board of Inspection and Survey from March 25–28, 2019.

Special Commissioning and Maiden Voyage

Ingalls Shipbuilding delivered Midgett to the U.S. Coast Guard on April 30, 2019. Immediately upon receipt, the Coast Guard placed the cutter in 'Commission Special'. A small ceremony was held on the Midgett flight deck on May 1, 2019 which was attended by the crew of the cutter, USCG Project Resident Office Gulf Coast, and Ingalls Shipbuilding representatives. The cutter made her final sail-away from Ingalls Shipbuilding on June 11, 2019 and commenced her maiden voyage.

In early July 2019 while transiting off of North Carolina, Midgett conducted her first search and rescue operation when directed to assist a mariner on a disabled sailing vessel. On July 9, 2019, a 'Midgett Legacy Reception' was held onboard the cutter in Norfolk Virginia. Over 100 members of the extended Midgett family attended the event and toured the new ship.

On July 25, 2019, during the vessel's transit to Honolulu, the Midgett seized more than 2,100 pounds of cocaine from a low-profile vessel in international waters in the Eastern Pacific. On July 31, 2019, the Midgett seized more than 4,600 pounds of cocaine from a second low-profile vessel, their second cocaine bust in five days.
Midgett arrived in her homeport of Honolulu for the first time on August 16, 2019.

Commissioning
The Midgett was commissioned by the Coast Guard on August 24, 2019 in a dual ceremony with USCGC Kimball (WMSL-756).

See also
 USCGC Midgett (WHEC-726)
 
 Integrated Deepwater System Program

References

External links

Legend-class cutters
Ships of the United States Coast Guard
2017 ships
Ships built in Pascagoula, Mississippi